Everybody's Talking, Nobody's Listening is the debut album by Caspa, a dubstep musician and producer. It was released on 4 May 2009 on Caspa's own label Sub Soldiers/Fabric Records. It features a number of guest producers and vocalists including an intro speech by reggae selector David Rodigan.

Critical reception

The album received mediocre to negative reviews. Daily Music Guide described the album as "amazingly organic for being so exactingly constructed" and compares Caspa to a classical composer.
NME wrote that the album "falls a little short of the wobbly swagger of his cohort’s club hits." URB stated that "his foray into putting out a full-length has produced what half-step usually procures; the all-too-well reaction of immediate mediocrity."

Track listings
It was released as a CD and three-piece vinyl package.

CD

Vinyl

References

2009 debut albums
Caspa albums